Pachylia ficus, known as the fig sphinx, is a moth of the  family Sphingidae. It lives from the northern tip of South America in Uruguay through Central America to the southern tip of the United States straying into Arizona and Texas.

Description 

Biology 
There are several generations per year in the tropics, peninsular Florida and southern Texas. Adults have been recorded in February, September and November in Brazil and in June in Panama. The adults feed on the nectar of various flowers, including Asystasia gangetica and the endangered ghost orchid (Dendrophylax lindenii). They also pollinate the ghost orchid.

The larvae have been recorded feeding on Ficus aurea, Ficus carica, Ficus microcarpa, Ficus religiosa, Ficus pumila, Ficus gamelleira, Ficus prinoides, Ficus pumila and Artocarpus integrifolia. There are several colour morphs. Pupation takes place in a cocoon spun amongst leaf litter.

References

External links
Fig sphinx Moths of America

Dilophonotini
Moths described in 1758
Taxa named by Carl Linnaeus
Sphingidae of South America
Moths of South America